Vesselina Vassileva Breskovska (Bulgarian: Веселина Василева Бресковска) (December 6, 1928, Granit, Stara Zagora Province, Bulgaria – August 12, 1997, Sofia, Bulgaria) was a 20th-century Bulgarian geologist, mineralogist and crystallographer.

Biography 

Vesselina Breskovska was born in Granit, the only daughter of educators Vassil Stoychev Breskovski and Paraskeva Breskovska. Her younger brother was the late paleontologist, Stoycho Vassilev Breskovski.  After successfully completing Second Young Women's High School in Plovdiv she was admitted to study in the Soviet Union.  In 1952, she took her degree in mineralogy at Leningrad State University.  Upon her return to Bulgaria she was appointed assistant professor in mineralogy at Sofia University.  Later she became docent and full professor, and taught the main courses in mineralogy, crystallography, X-ray analysis to students of natural sciences.  Her favorite lecture course was "Minerals in Bulgaria" and students appreciated it.  She taught it for many years, and dedicated a major portion of her research to treating the subject in a systematic manner.  In 1988 she was awarded the title Doctor of Science by Sofia University. Breskovska was noted for her thorough research on sulfosalt, chlorosulfosalt minerals and on artificial minerals containing selenium.  In 1978 her efforts were rewarded with the discovery of a new mineral, which she named Ardaite after the river Arda.

Another part of her scientific work focused on paragenesis and mineralogy of gold and silver ores as well as on the polymetallic ore deposits containing gold in Sredna Gora and eastern Rhodope Mountains. She was successful in identifying more than 100 minerals and their varieties in these ore deposits.

Vesselina Breskovska's administrative positions included: Scientific Secretary of the Bulgarian Academy of Sciences (1973–1977), Dean of the Faculty of Geology and Geography (1980–1984) and Vice Rector in Charge of International Relations of Sofia University (1984–88).  Since 1959 she had been a member of New Minerals Nomenclature and Classification Commission of the International Mineralogical Association, and was the general secretary of their 13th Congress. At the time of her death in 1997 she was president of the Bulgarian Mineralogical Society.

Her collection of minerals was preserved in the Museum of Mineralogy at Sofia University. 

Breskovska had been a foreign member of the Russian Academy of Natural Sciences, honorary member of the Russian Mineralogical Society and a member of New York Academy of Sciences.
 
Her daughter, son-in-law and son have also been scientists.

Publications 

She was author of more than 130 scientific publications, including: with co-authors Ivan Kostov, J. Minčeva-Stefanova, G. Kirov (1964), The Minerals of Bulgaria (in Bulgarian); with co-author Ivan Kostov (1989), Phosphate, Arsenate and Vanadate Minerals. Crystal Chemistry and Classification.

Notes

See also 

 List of minerals recognized by the International Mineralogical Association

References 
 
 
 In Memoriam, Professor Vesselina Breskovska (1928-1997), Review of the Bulgarian Geological Society, vol. 58, 1997, part 2, p. 136, (in Bulgarian).
 B. Mavrudchiev (2008), Memoirs of Famous Bulgarian Scientists Mineralogists, Review of the Bulgarian Geological Society, vol. 69, part 1–3, pp. 112–115 (in Bulgarian).
 Bozhidar Mavrudchiev (2005), Pages from the Calendar of Bulgarian Geology (1828-2005) [Stranitsi of kalendara na bulgarskata geologija (1828-2005), p. 93.
 Kostov-Kytin, V., J. Macicek, V. Breskovska, R. Petrova. (2005), Lead-antimony chlorine sulphosalts synthesis, crystal chemistry and prognosis for new structures. – In: Zidarov, N., Z. Damyanov, B. Zidarova, I. Donchev, M. Tarassov, O. Vitov (eds.). Jubilee volume Ten years Central Laboratory of Mineralogy and Crystallography Acad. I. Kostov, Sofia: BAS, Acad. publishing house "Marin Drinov", pp. 147–150 (in Bulgarian).

External links 

 
 
 
 
 Honorary Members of the Russian Mineralogical Society

 

1928 births
1997 deaths
Bulgarian mineralogists
Burials at Central Sofia Cemetery
Bulgarian women geologists
People from Stara Zagora Province
20th-century women scientists
Saint Petersburg State University alumni
Women mineralogists